Thulladha Manamum Thullum is a 1999 Indian Tamil-language romantic drama film directed by debutant Ezhil. It stars Vijay and Simran, while Manivannan, Dhamu and Vaiyapuri among others play supporting roles. The film is produced by R. B. Choudary and has its score and soundtrack composed by S. A. Rajkumar and cinematography performed by R. Selva. The film released on 29 January 1999 and became a commercial success.

Plot 
Kutty is an aspiring but struggling singer who works for a local cable provider Mani. He is unable to get recognition and a stage to exhibit his musical talent. Rukmini "Rukku", a college student, is new to the locality where Kutty stays, and on hearing Kutty's voice, she becomes his fan and decides to seek him and encourage his talent as his voice resembles that of her late father. However, Rukku always catches Kutty in negative situations and, not knowing that he is Kutty, develops a hatred for him as she feels that he is a rowdy. Once, when Kutty is pickpocketed, he pursues the pickpocket to Rukku's college. In the process, he accidentally drops a bottle of acid to the ground, which causes Rukku, who is present at the spot where the acid bottle fell, to become blind.

Kutty is horrified when he finds out that he is the reason Rukku had become blind. To make amends, he decides to become her close companion and help her in every way possible. Soon, love blossoms between the two. When Kutty's mother dies, Kutty finds out that her eyes had been donated. He decides to arrange the operation to restore Rukku's eyesight with his mother's eyes, but as the price of the operation turns out to be very high, he accepts an offer from a Sikh man to donate a kidney for his Pune-based father for 40,000. Having paid for Rukku's surgery, Kutty leaves for Pune to donate his kidney. While waiting at the railway station to return to Chennai, he is framed as a terrorist and arrested.

Seven years later, Kutty is released from prison and returns to Chennai, only to find out that Rukku has moved out of their locality and is now a collector, her eyesight having been restored as well. But Rukku, on seeing Kutty and not knowing that he is Kutty, orders for him to be arrested, in revenge for his "rowdy activities" in the past and for making her blind. But when Kutty begins to sing, Rukku realises that the "rowdy" she had arrested is none other than Kutty. She apologises for misunderstanding him, and they happily embrace, rekindling their relationship.

Cast

Production

Development 
The film saw director Ezhil, an erstwhile assistant to Robert–Rajasekar, Panneer and Parthiban, make his debut as a filmmaker under R. B. Choudary's production house Super Good Films. The film's concept was inspired from Charlie Chaplin's City Lights (1931) that Ezhil had watched during a film festival. An earlier version of the script showed the lead character as a painter. The initial title for the film was Rukmanikkaga but Choudary later changed it to Thulladha Manamum Thullum.

Casting 
Ezhil initially wanted comedian Vadivelu to play the lead role. Vadivelu, who was impressed with the story, told Ezhil that the storyline was too good and he did not know whether it would work with him in the lead. Vadivelu asked Ezhil to wait for six months, and if he did not find anyone else by then, he would take the role. Vadivelu was ultimately replaced by Vijay. Murali was also considered for the lead role before Vijay was selected. On the suggestion of his friends, Ezhil decided to make the film with a commercial hero and changed the entire script retaining only the emotional core of City Lights. Prior to its release, the role of Vijay's mother in the film was kept under wraps with the media speculating who would play the role. Eventually, no actress played the role although the character played a pivotal part in the film. Rambha was initially supposed to do the project, but as the project underwent changes, the actress opted out before she was replaced by Simran.

Filming 
Principal photography began with the "Dhuddu" song as the director felt it would give the team some time to gel. This was the first Vijay song which Raju Sundaram choreographed. The story takes place in Triplicane because Ezhil had lived there for a while in his uncle's house. The team scouted for a long time to find a suitable location that fit the story's requirements however a chance visit to the set of a Malayalam film at Murugalaya Studios convinced Ezhil that erecting a set would be far more cost-effective and thus set resembling Triplicane was erected.

Soundtrack 

The soundtrack was composed by S. A. Rajkumar, while lyrics were written by Vairamuthu and Muthu Vijayan. Rajkumar agreed to compose the music for this film after learning that Ezhil had assisted Robert–Rajasekar, the duo who introduced him in films.

The song "Meghamaai Vandhu" which was supposed to be the theme song of the film, was inspired from Urdu song "Sayonee" sang by the band Junoon in 1997 in Pakistan; Ezhil wanted a Tamil version of it. After the song was recorded, he learned that Deva had used the same tune for "Salomiya" from Kannedhirey Thondrinal. Rajkumar told him not to worry and gave him the tune of "Innisai Paadi Varum".

Release 
Thulladha Manamum Thullum was released on 29 January 1999. The film received positive reviews and became a commercial success (ran over 200 days at the box office).

Reception 
Lakshmy from Deccan Herald mentioned that "the experience of seeing the film is simply thrilling", mentioning that the success comes from "the naivete, the simplicity, the absolute lack of sophistication, and from the delightful hero (Vijay)". Rajitha of Rediff.com praised the "unusual premise" and wrote that Ezhil "makes a strong debut with this film". Sandya Krishna wrote for Indolink, "A typical R.B.Choudhri production with a debutante director, Ezhil at the helm. If you don't carry huge expectations to the theater or to the video store, you might actually enjoy this film. But mind you... You have to be a Vijay and Simran fan first!" Ananda Vikatan rated the film 41 out of 100.

Accolades 
The film won three awards at the Tamil Nadu State Film Awards, which include second prize for Best Film (R. B. Choudary), Best Actress (Simran), and the MGR Honorary Award (Vijay).

Legacy 
The success of Thulladha Manamum Thullum led to more offers for Simran, who with Thulladha Manamum Thullum and Vaali, established herself among the leading actresses in Tamil films. Vijay and Simran were also paired together in several other films after the film's success, with projects titled Priyamaanavale (2000) and Udhaya (2004) launched weeks after the film's release. The film went on to be remade in Telugu as Nuvvu Vastavani, in Kannada as O Nanna Nalle, in Indian Bengali as Sathi, in Odia as I Love You, in Manipuri as Angaobasu Thamoi Palli, in Bangladeshi Bengali as Preyo Shathi  and in Bhojpuri as Pyar Jab Kehu Se Hui Jala.

References

External links 
 

1990s romantic musical films
1990s Tamil-language films
1999 directorial debut films
1999 films
1999 romantic drama films
Films about blind people in India
Films directed by Ezhil
Films scored by S. A. Rajkumar
Indian romantic drama films
Indian romantic musical films
Tamil films remade in other languages
Super Good Films films